Thea Megan Trinidad Büdgen (born December 27, 1990) is an American professional wrestler and actress. She is currently signed to WWE, where she performs on the SmackDown brand under the ring name Zelina Vega, and is a member of Legado Del Fantasma. She is a former WWE Women's Tag Team Champion, and the winner of its 2021 Queen's Crown tournament. Trinidad is the first of just three women to hold the women's world tag team championships of both WWE and Impact Wrestling (the two others being Cassie Lee and Jessie McKay).

Trinidad is also known for her time in Total Nonstop Action Wrestling as Rosita, where she was a one-time TNA Knockouts Tag Team Champion with Sarita, and for various independent promotions under her real name. She debuted on WWE's NXT brand in 2017 under the ring name Zelina Vega, where she predominantly served as the manager of Andrade "Cien" Almas. WWE released Trinidad in November 2020, but re-signed her less than six months later. Trinidad's ring name was changed to Queen Zelina after her Queen's Crown tournament win.

Trinidad portrayed fellow professional wrestler AJ Lee in the 2019 biographical film Fighting with My Family.

Early life 
Thea Megan Trinidad was born in the Queens borough of New York City on December 27, 1990, and is of Puerto Rican descent. She grew up watching professional wrestling with her father Michael and younger brother Timothy, and was inspired by Rey Mysterio and Lita. Her parents divorced when she and her brother were young, though they remained friends. She practiced swimming and baseball at school. When she was 10 years old, her father was killed in the September 11 attacks; he had worked as a telecom analyst for Cantor Fitzgerald at the World Trade Center, and was on the 103rd floor of the North Tower when it collapsed.

Her mother, Monique Ferrer, approached StoryCorps with the story of how she and her husband had met and what she experienced on the day of the attacks with his death, which StoryCorps used to create a short cartoon titled Always a Family as a way of honoring his memory. She has said it was because of her father that made her enter the wrestling business. She was featured in an NBC special, titled Children of 9/11, on September 5, 2011. Growing up, she also worked as a counselor on a camp for children that had lost parents on 9/11 and also participated in charitable causes such as Habitat for Humanity with Tuesday's Children after Hurricane Katrina.

Professional wrestling career

Early career (2010–2011) 
At the age of 17, Trinidad began training under Javi-Air, Azrieal, and T. J. Perkins. Trinidad made her professional wrestling debut under the ring name Divina Fly for National Wrestling Superstars (NWS) on February 20, 2010, in Bloomfield, New Jersey, where she competed against Brittney Savage in a losing effort. On the August 21 NWS event, Fly competed against Niya in a losing effort. On October 1 at an NWS event, Trinidad, now under the ring name Snookie Fly, teamed up with Judas Young and Mike Dennis in a losing effort to Brittney Savage and Team Supreme (Corvis Fear and Nicky Oceans) in a mixed-tag-team match.

On February 20, 2010, she made her debut for Women Superstars Uncensored (WSU), under the ring name Divina Fly in a losing effort against Brittney Savage. On June 26, 2010, Divina Fly and Niya, collectively known as The Fly Girls, competed for the WSU Tag Team Championships but lost to the reigning champions, Cindy Rogers and Jana. On September 11, 2010, Divina Fly won a match against newcomer Candy Cartwright with a Fly Cutter.

Total Nonstop Action Wrestling (2011–2013) 

After being discovered by Tommy Dreamer, Trinidad wrestled in a tryout dark match at Total Nonstop Action Wrestling's (TNA) Impact! television tapings on January 11, 2011, losing to Angelina Love. On January 27 it was reported that Trinidad had signed a contract with the promotion. On the February 10 episode of Impact!, Trinidad, under the ring name Rosita debuted as the storyline cousin of Sarita in an eight-woman tag team match, where the two of them teamed with Madison Rayne and Tara and defeated Angelina Love, Mickie James, Velvet Sky and Winter, when Rosita pinned Sky.

In February 2011, Rosita and Sarita defeated Angelina Love and Velvet Sky to earn a shot at Love's and Winter's TNA Knockouts Tag Team Championship. On March 13 at Victory Road, Rosita and Sarita defeated Love and Winter to win the TNA Knockouts Tag Team Championship, with Sarita proclaiming that their victory would start a Mexican takeover of TNA. On the following episode of Impact!, the alliance of Rosita, Sarita and Hernandez was named Mexican America. The three of them were then defeated in a six-person street fight by Love, Winter and Matt Morgan. On March 24, the three were joined by Anarquia. In the following weeks Rosita and Sarita successfully defended the Knockouts Tag Team Championship first against The Beautiful People (Angelina Love and Velvet Sky) and then against Madison Rayne and Tara. They made their third successful defense on the June 16 episode of Impact Wrestling, defeating Velvet Sky and Ms. Tessmacher, following outside interference from ODB. Rosita and Sarita lost the TNA Knockouts Tag Team Championship to Ms. Tessmacher and Tara on July 12 at the tapings of the July 21 episode of Impact Wrestling. They received a rematch on August 7 at Hardcore Justice, but were defeated by Tessmacher and Tara. On the March 22, 2012, episode of Impact Wrestling, Rosita and Sarita again failed to recapture the Knockouts Tag Team Championship, when they were defeated by Eric Young and ODB.

On April 19 episode of TNA Impact, Rosita and Sarita teamed up with Madison Rayne and Gail Kim in a losing effort to Brooke Tessmacher, Tara, Velvet Sky and Mickie James. Rosita and Sarita were given another title opportunity on April 15 at Lockdown, but were once again defeated by Eric Young and ODB, this time in a steel cage match. Afterwards, both Rosita and Sarita went inactive from TNA, while Anarquia left the promotion and Hernandez turned face, effectively ending Mexican America. After months of inactivity, it was reported on January 9, 2013, that Trinidad's contract with TNA had expired and she had parted ways with the promotion.

Independent circuit (2011–2017) 
In late August 2011, Rosita traveled to Mexico to attend an event held by the Consejo Mundial de Lucha Libre (CMLL) promotion, for which Sarita regularly works under the ring name Dark Angel. During Rosita's stay in Mexico, she was trained by CMLL trainers, Arturo Beristain and Tony Salazar, and was eventually offered a contract with the promotion, which she, however, could not sign due to TNA's working relationship with rival promotion AAA. Just days later, Rosita appeared on AAA's television program, Sin Límite, promoting a storyline, where wrestlers from TNA were invading the promotion.

On May 14, 2011, Rosita made her in-ring debut for Family Wrestling Entertainment (FWE) at the Meltdown pay-per-view, losing to fellow knockout Winter with Christy Hemme as the special guest referee. Rosita and Winter had three rematches, first on August 20 at Empire City Showdown, the second on November 15 at Fallout and the third on December 17 at Haastility; all were won by Winter. Rosita made her return to the promotion on March 24, 2012, at the Welcome to the Rumble pay-per-view, where she unsuccessfully challenged Maria Kanellis for FWE Women's Championship in a three-way match, after Winter pinned her to become the new champion.

On May 6, 2015, Global Force Wrestling (GFW) announced Trinidad as part of their roster. She debuted for the promotion on June 12, 2015, where she defeated Lei'D Tapa at the first show of the GFW Grand Slam Tour in Jackson, Tennessee. On August 20, 2015, her profile was removed from GFW website.

On July 17, 2015, Trinidad made her debut in Ring of Honor (ROH), managing Austin Aries. On September 2, 2016, she joined Shine Wrestling, debuting on Shine 37, which she ended up defeating Stormie Lee. On September 20, 2016, she made her debut in World Wonder Ring Stardom, defeating Kris Wolf.

WWE

Managerial role (2017–2020)
On March 4, 2013, Trinidad took part in a tryout for WWE. She made several brief appearances in the promotion in 2014, including as one of Adam Rose's "rosebuds", and lost a match against NXT Women's Champion Asuka on the October 26, 2016 episode of NXT.

By June 2017, Trinidad had signed a contract with WWE and began training at the WWE Performance Center. She started appearing on NXT with the June 9 episode, where she confronted Andrade "Cien" Almas about his behavior and slapped him. On the July 19 episode of NXT, she accompanied Almas as he attacked Cezar Bononi and retreated from No Way Jose. Under the name Zelina Vega, she was established as the heel manager of Almas, who defeated No Way Jose on August 9 episode of NXT. At NXT TakeOver: WarGames on November 18, Vega accompanied Almas to a match against Drew McIntyre for the NXT Championship, where she interfered by attempting to perform a hurricanrana on McIntyre, failing on the first attempt, but managed to perform a hurricanrana driver on him later in the match before Almas captured the title. On January 27, 2018, at NXT TakeOver: Philadelphia, during Almas' title defense against Johnny Gargano, Vega interfered and performed a diving hurricanrana on Gargano, resulting in her being attacked by Gargano's wife, Candice LeRae, while Almas eventually won the match. On January 28 at Royal Rumble, Vega made her first main roster appearance as she accompanied Almas in his entrance as number 7 during the Royal Rumble match. On the April 18 episode of NXT, Vega was accompanied by Almas during her first televised match in which she was defeated by Candice LeRae. This turned out to be Vega's and Almas' last appearances in NXT.

On April 17 during the Superstar Shake-up, Vega and Almas were both drafted to the SmackDown brand. Vega made her debut for the brand on May 15, accompanying Almas in a match against a local wrestler. On the July 31 episode of SmackDown, Vega had her first match on the brand, defeating Lana. She and Almas defeated Lana and Rusev at SummerSlam on August 19. At Evolution on October 28, Vega competed in a battle royal for a future women's championship match, but was eliminated by eventual winner Nia Jax. At WrestleMania 35 on April 7, she participated in the Women's Battle Royal but failed to win.

During the 2019 WWE Superstar Shake-up, both Zelina and Andrade were drafted to the Raw brand. On April 22 however, Zelina was moved back to the SmackDown brand. As part of the 2019 Draft in October, Vega and Almas (now renamed Andrade) were drafted to the Raw brand. Vega assisted Andrade most of the times and helped him retain the United States Championship on various occasions. Vega participated in the women's Royal Rumble match at the namesake pay-per-view on January 26 at #25 but was eliminated by Shayna Baszler. With Andrade and new tag team partner Angel Garza arguing and fighting each other constantly, Vega appeared to end her association with her clients on the September 14 edition of Raw, interrupting and confronting Asuka after she defeated Mickie James, initiating a feud. The following week, Vega defeated James to earn a title match against Asuka for the Raw Women's Championship at Clash of Champions on September 27, which she lost via submission.

As part of the 2020 Draft in October, Vega was drafted to the SmackDown brand. On November 13, 2020, WWE announced that they had released Trinidad from her contract. That same day, Trinidad had tweeted her support for unionization in professional wrestling. It was later reported that the release was due to Trinidad's opposition to WWE "requiring talents to acquiesce control" of their accounts on third-party platforms.

Queen Zelina (2021–2022) 
Nearly eight months after her initial release, Vega returned on the July 2, 2021 episode of SmackDown, where it was announced that she would be competing in the 2021 Women’s Money in the Bank ladder match; she made her in-ring return the same night in a loss to Liv Morgan. At the event on July 18, she failed to win the match. On the August 27 episode of SmackDown, she competed in a fatal four-way elimination match to determine the #1 contender for the SmackDown Women's Championship, which was won by Bianca Belair. As part of the 2021 Draft, Vega was drafted to the Raw brand, which took effect on October 22. Before that, Vega entered the inaugural Queen's Crown tournament, representing SmackDown, where she defeated Toni Storm in the first round and Carmella in the semi-finals. At Crown Jewel on October 21, Vega defeated Raw's Doudrop in the finals to win the tournament and be crowned "Queen"; her first accolade in WWE. On the following episode of Raw, now officially a member of the Raw brand, Vega had a coronation for her victory, where she was adorned with a crown, cape, and scepter, and her ring name was changed to Queen Zelina; she defeated Doudrop in a rematch using her scepter. On the November 8 episode of Raw, she competed in a fatal five-way match to determine the #1 contender to the Raw Women's Championship, which was won by Liv Morgan. She participated in the 5 on 5 Survivor Series elimination match at Survivor Series on November 21, but was eliminated by Toni Storm. 

On the following episode of Raw, Queen Zelina and Carmella defeated Rhea Ripley and Nikki A.S.H to win the WWE Women's Tag Team Championship, marking Queen Zelina's first title in WWE. On the January 3. 2022 episode of Raw, they retained the titles against Ripley and A.S.H. in a rematch. At Royal Rumble on January 29, she entered at #7, eliminating Sasha Banks before she was eliminated by Ripley. On the second night of WrestleMania 38 on April 3, Queen Zelina and Carmella lost the titles in a fatal four-way tag team match to Sasha Banks and Naomi, which also involved Liv Morgan and Rhea Ripley and Natalya and Shayna Baszler, ending their reign at 131 days. In May, it was reported that she was out of action due to an in-ring injury which required surgery.

Legado Del Fantasma (2022–present) 

After a seven-month hiatus, Vega returned on the October 7 episode of SmackDown, aligning herself with Legado Del Fantasma and attacking Hit Row. At the Royal Rumble on 28 January 2023, Vega entered the Women's Royal Rumble match at #21. She eliminated Xia Li before being eliminated by Lacey Evans. On the March 10 episode of Smackdown, Vega joined Legado Del Fantasma in helping Rey Mysterio against The Judgment Day, turning face for the first time in 6 years.

Other media 
Trinidad appeared in the 2012 film Dorothy and the Witches of Oz. She appeared in the documentary Children of 9/11, and on the first and twentieth anniversaries of the September 11 Memorial Ceremony, she participated in the reading of victim names. She portrayed professional wrestler AJ Lee in the sports drama film Fighting with My Family. She has said that Dwayne Johnson (aka The Rock) inspired her to act in films.

Trinidad appears as a non-playable manager in WWE 2K19 and then as a playable character in WWE 2K20 and WWE 2K23.

Trinidad also features in Street Fighter 6 as an in-game commentator.

Personal life 
In 2018, Trinidad married Dutch professional wrestler Tom Büdgen, also known as Malakai Black (formerly known as Aleister Black in WWE). She resides in Tampa, Florida.

On the 10th anniversary of the September 11 attacks, Trinidad spoke about her father who died as a result of the terrorist attack in an out-of-character interview on TNA's No Surrender pay-per-view.
She appeared at the 20th anniversary of the 9/11 attacks, and honoured her father as she read out his name.  He died just after 09:00 on September 11, 2001, barely 10 minutes after United Airlines flight 175 crashed into the South Tower. She was accompanied by another woman, who lost her loved one, Phillip Miller that day.

Championships and accomplishments 
Pro Wrestling Illustrated
Inspirational Wrestler of the Year (2011)
Ranked No. 31 of the top 50 female wrestlers in the PWI Female 50 in 2011
 Sports Illustrated
 Ranked No. 30 in the top 30 female wrestlers in 2018
Total Nonstop Action Wrestling
TNA Knockouts Tag Team Championship (1 time) – with Sarita
 WWE
 WWE Women's Tag Team Championship (1 time) – with Carmella
 Queen's Crown (2021)

References

External links 

 
 
 
 

1990 births
21st-century American actresses
21st-century professional wrestlers
Actresses from New York City
American exercise instructors
American film actresses
American people of Puerto Rican descent
American sportspeople of Puerto Rican descent
American television actresses
American YouTubers
Cosplayers
Expatriate professional wrestlers in Japan
Female models from New York (state)
Living people
People associated with the September 11 attacks
Professional wrestlers from New York (state)
Professional wrestlers from New York City
Professional wrestling managers and valets
Puerto Rican female professional wrestlers
Sportspeople from Queens, New York
Twitch (service) streamers
TNA/Impact Knockouts World Tag Team Champions
WWE Women's Tag Team Champions